Preet Kaur may refer to:
 Preet Kaur Gill, British politician serving as Member of Parliament (MP) for Birmingham Edgbaston
 Preet Kaur Nayak, Indian television actress